This is a list of Italians have been awarded the Nobel Prize.

Laureates

References

Nobel laureates
Italian